KfW Westarkade is a 60.1-meter (197 ft) office building located in Frankfurt, Germany. The 14-storey building completed in 2010, is located in the Westend district in Frankfurt and serves as the headquarters for KfW, the German state-owned development bank. The KfW Westarkade is an example of sustainable architecture, which was led by three key factors, natural ventilation, activated slabs and geothermal energy, and the building is one of the first office towers in the world predicted to run on less than 90KWh/m2 of primary energy per year. The KfW Westarkade was named the Council on Tall Buildings and Urban Habitat 2011 Best Tall Building Overall.

Background
The KfW Westarkade began construction in 2007 following the demolition of the library which had previously sat at the space. The Westarkade contains conference facilities and office space for 700 people, and served to expand the KfW campus in the area, which includes buildings constructed from the 1970s through to 1990s.

See also
 List of tallest buildings in Frankfurt
 List of tallest buildings in Germany
 List of tallest buildings in Europe

References

External links

Buildings and structures in Frankfurt
Office buildings completed in 2010